David Alan Meniketti (born December 12, 1953) is the singer, songwriter and lead guitarist for hard rock/heavy metal band Y&T. He has also released three solo efforts (including "Live in Japan"), one of which is more blues-oriented. He currently tours worldwide with Y&T.

With the death of guitarist Joey Alves in March 2017, Meniketti is the last surviving member of the band's classic lineup (1974–1986), which also included bassist Phil Kennemore (d. 2011) and drummer Leonard Haze (d. 2016).

History
Dave Meniketti was born and raised in Oakland, California where he has been an icon for guitar players worldwide and a San Francisco Bay Area vocal and guitar legend for over four decades.  Perhaps it is the diversity of the artists that influenced him as a kid (Jimi Hendrix, John Coltrane, Leslie West, James Brown, Led Zeppelin) that is responsible for his varied expressions in both his singing and his guitar playing. He's ranked tops in Best Guitarist polls in newspapers, magazines, and television shows around the world.

As the lead singer/lead guitarist with Bay Area rockers Y&T, Meniketti has sold over four million records worldwide. With Y&T, he has recorded 19 albums, and continues to tour the world each year. His style has influenced some of the major stars in rock and over the years he's been asked to join many top bands including Ozzy Osbourne, Peter Frampton, Whitesnake and others. Faith No More, Secret Chiefs 3, and former Mr. Bungle guitarist Trey Spruance said in an interview with Kerrang! magazine in 1991: "... of course, I owe it [his guitar playing speed] all to Y&T. Dave Meniketti is my god."

In the movie Anvil! The Story of Anvil, in the bonus feature interview Lars Ulrich of Metallica talks at length about seeing one of his favorite bands Y&T for the first time at a club in Hollywood in December 1980. Lars Ulrich credits Y&T as the reason he decided to become a musician, saying: "That was the turning point for me wanting to play music. . . . You could tell that they loved what they were doing."

In the early 1990s, while Y&T took a break from recording and performing, Meniketti built his own recording studio and proceeded to record his first solo album titled ON THE BLUE SIDE, which represented his passion for the blues. He would later release a follow up album simply titled MENIKETTI. Recorded in Tokyo, a live concert CD was released by Avex Records in 2003 titled MENIKETTI LIVE IN JAPAN.

In the summer of 2013, Sammy Hagar invited Dave to perform a set of Montrose tunes with the original Montrose band members for two Northern California shows on Sammy's "Four Decades of Rock" tour. One of the reasons Sammy chose Dave was Hagar's feeling that Meniketti would be the right choice to do justice to the memory and playing style of Ronnie Montrose.

In January 2020, Y&T celebrated 46 years of recording and touring the world, and will continue to do so for the foreseeable future.

Meniketti and his wife, Jill, also produce award-winning wines under the Meniketti Wines label.

Equipment
Currently, Dave plays Gibson Les Pauls and Fender Stratocasters. He has been playing a sunburst Gibson Les Paul Standard since the early 1970s, and even during the late-'80s when such a guitar was considered out of style, as seen in the music video for Contagious. In the 2000s, George Bisceglia of Bisceglia Guitars built Dave a custom made LP style guitar. Meniketti has also been seen playing Fender Stratocasters and Kramer guitars. In 2018 he added Yamaha's new line of Revstar guitars.

For amplification, he uses Diezel VH4 heads, with a Mesa/Boogie Dual Rectifier as a back-up.

References

External links

American heavy metal guitarists
American heavy metal singers
1953 births
American people of Italian descent
Living people
Lead guitarists
Musicians from Oakland, California
Singers from California
Guitarists from California
American male guitarists
20th-century American guitarists
20th-century American male musicians